"Father, Wake Us In Passing", is an internationally acclaimed poem by the Indian English poet Gopi Kottoor. The poem is a unique work of art, peerless in its genre in modern Indian literature. It has been translated into German as Vater, wecke' uns im Vorübergehen. It is among the better known poems in modern Indian English literature.

Origin of the poem
The poem was composed by Kottoor when his father was in coma, and was dying. The tumultuous emotional experience associated with watching the slow but inevitable death of one's own father has been poignantly channeled by the poet into this acclaimed masterpiece.

Structure of the poem
Father, Wake Us In Passing is not a single poem, but rather a series of short poems held together under a unified structure in terms of style, content and execution. The work can be structurally analysed into three distinct parts: (1) Father, (2) Wake Us and (3) In Passing. In the first part the poet describes his personal emotional relationship with his father. In the second part, the poet takes his relationship with his father to a metaphysical level. The last part depicts the departed father's figurative journey into the realm of the infinite and intangible.

Although technically speaking, Father, Wake Us in Passing is one long poem, in the words of the poet Kottoor himself, it is rather a "book of poems".

Comments and criticism
The poem has been widely acclaimed for its bold approach in depicting an unusual and almost taboo topic, that of dispassionately analyzing one's own father's death. The poem received positive reviews in German following its translation by the German poet Wolfgang Heyder (b. 1956). The poem in German appeared as a Laufschrift Book edition (Vater, Wecke' uns im Vorübergehen) in 2004 at Fürth, Germany. This work is peerless in its genre in Indian English writing and has received critical acclaim in India and abroad ever since it was first published.

See also
Indian poetry

References

External links
"German Translation in Micro-film"
German Laufschrift Version
Famous Poets of India

Indian poems
Indian English poems
English-language poems